A driving instructor is a person who is hired by a new driver who is learning how to improve their skills - often for an upcoming practical test. Different countries have different rules regarding permits and other regulations. Driving instructors have several tasks such as teaching new drivers the theory and techniques needed to carefully operate various types of vehicles such as cars, motorcycles, trucks and buses. A driving instructor has several names and can be recognized as: Auto Driving Instructor, Educator, Instructor, Teacher or Truck Driving Instructor.

Duties and responsibilities

The duties and responsibilities of a driving instructor are to manage the theory class timings, teach the driving students about the right traffic rules and inform student drivers with safety driving procedures. In addition to that, driving instructors supply their students with information about emergency situations.

After the classes about theory knowledge, driving instructors help their driving students in practically learning how to drive a car individually. At the beginning, the driving instructor teaches the student how to use a steering wheel, how to reverse and how to park. In addition, the driving instructor advises the student about their level of improvement in practical driving and then the student is informed about the date of practical test on the road.

Characteristics of a driving instructor

A driving instructor must possess several characteristics in order to help the new driving student understand the theory of driving and also in order for the student to practically operate the vehicle.
Some of the characteristics required in a driving instructor include confidence, patience and good communications skills. On top of that, a driving instructor must be able to acquire good teaching skills.

Working hours

The working hours of a driving instructor must be adjustable enough to suit the needs of the student. In general, driving instructors might need to work during the evening and sometimes even during the weekend. Additionally, instructors may require working longer hours during the summer months according to the availability of the driving student.

Salaries

Salaries of a driving instructor vary from country to country. For example, in the United Kingdom, a beginner driving instructor makes about £15,000 a year while an experienced driving instructor makes about £30,000 a year.

In the United States, a driving instructor with medium experience gains around $36,000 a year while an experienced driving instructor makes around $53,000 a year.

Requirements to be a driving instructor

To be eligible to be a driving instructor, one must possess several requirements such as obtaining a high school diploma (College/University degree is not compulsory), owning a driving licence and a driving instructor licence as well, gaining driving experience of 2–5 years (varies according to different countries), having clean driving records, passing driving instructor vision test and the driving instructor must sometimes be at least 21 years old. 
The job openings of a driving instructor differ according to the growth of the population.

Coursework to be a certified driving instructor

There are a few course topics that much be covered to be a certified driving instructor. Some topics are: regulations of driving, knowledge of the components of different types of vehicles and skills on teaching theory in the classroom.

For example, to become an Approved Driving Instructor in the UK, you must first pass 3 different exams. Theory, driving and teaching.

In countries like Singapore, teachings by all private driving instructor have been regulated by the Government of Singapore such that only schools like Comfort Delgro Driving Center, Singapore Safety Driving Center and Bukit Batok Driving Center still actively recruit and train driving instructors. Private driving instructors are slowly being phased out in Singapore.

References

Driving
Driver's education